Demographics of the province of Prince Edward Island, Canada. According to the 2011 National Household Survey, the largest ethnic group consists of people of Scottish descent (39.2%), followed by English (31.1%), Irish (30.4%), French (21.1%), German (5.2%), and Dutch (3.1%) descent. Prince Edward Island is mostly a white community and there are few visible minorities. Chinese people are the largest visible minority group of Prince Edward Island, comprising 1.3% of the province's population. Almost half of respondents identified their ethnicity as "Canadian." Prince Edward Island is by a strong margin the most Celtic and specifically the most Scottish province in Canada and perhaps the most Scottish place (ethnically) in the world, outside Scotland. 38% of islanders claim Scottish ancestry, but this is an underestimate and it is thought that almost 50% of islanders have Scottish roots. When combined with Irish and Welsh, almost 80% of islanders are of some Celtic stock, albeit most families have resided in PEI for at least two centuries. Few places outside Europe can claim such a homogeneous Celtic ethnic background. The only other jurisdiction in North America with such a high percentage of British Isles heritage is Newfoundland.

Population history

Population geography

Census Metropolitan Areas

Cities and towns
All statistics according to Canada 2016 Census, unless otherwise specified

Ethnic origins

 .

Visible minorities and Aboriginals

Languages

Knowledge of languages

The question on knowledge of languages allows for multiple responses. The following figures are from the 2021 Canadian Census and the 2016 Canadian Census, and lists languages that were selected by at least 0.5 per cent of respondents.

Mother tongue

The 2006 Canadian census showed a population of 135,851. Of the 133,570 singular responses to the question concerning mother tongue the most commonly reported languages were: 

There were also 30 single-language responses for Greek and Niger-Congo languages n.i.e.; 25 for Russian; 20 for Ukrainian; 15 for Finnish, Germanic languages n.i.e., Inuktitut, Maltese, Persian and Tagalog; and 10 for Czech, Estonian, Portuguese, Slovenian, Turkish and Vietnamese. In addition, there were also 105 responses of English and a non-official language; 25 of French and a non-official language; 495 of English and French; and 10 of English, French, and a non-official language. (Figures shown are for the number of single language responses and the percentage of total single-language responses.)

Religion

 

The Roman Catholic Diocese of Charlottetown comprises the entire Island and is the second oldest English diocese in Canada. The Archdiocese of Kingston is the oldest.

Migration

Immigration 

The 2021 census reported that immigrants (individuals born outside Canada) comprise 11,765 persons or 7.8 percent of the total population of Prince Edward Island.

Recent immigration 
The 2021 Canadian census counted a total of 4,860 people who immigrated to Prince Edward Island between 2016 and 2021.

Interprovincial migration

Since 1971, Prince Edward Island mostly had years of positive interprovincial migration. However, in the 2010s, it turned to the negative. This interprovincial migration exceeded all immigration to the province in 2015.

Source: Statistics Canada

See also
Demographics of Canada
Population of Canada by province and territory

References

Prince Edward Island
Prince Edward Island society